The 2022–23 Women's T20 Super League was the fourth edition of the Women's T20 Super League competition, that took place in South Africa. It took place from 12 to 16 December 2022, with 4 teams competing: three composite teams of the best players in South Africa, and the South Africa Under-19 team for the 2023 ICC Under-19 Women's T20 World Cup. With five matches abandoned due to rain, no overall winner was declared for the competition. Starlights topped the group standings, winning all of their completed matches.

Competition format
The four teams played each other twice in a double round-robin, therefore playing six matches. Matches were played using a Twenty20 format. All matches were played at Newlands Cricket Ground in Cape Town.

The league worked on a points system with positions being based on the total points. Points were awarded as follows:

Win: 2 points. 
Tie: 1 point. 
Loss: 0 points.
Abandoned/No Result: 1 point.

Squads
The squads for Coronations, Starlights and Thistles were announced on 25 November 2022, whilst the South Africa Under-19 squad was announced on 6 December 2022.

Points table

Fixtures

Notes

References

Women's T20 Super League
2022 in South African cricket